Sesil Radoslavova Karatantcheva (born 8 August 1989) is a Bulgarian inactive tennis player.

In her career, she won nine singles titles on the ITF Women's Circuit. On 7 November 2005, she reached her best singles ranking of world No. 35. On 19 April 2010, she peaked at No. 154 in the doubles rankings.

Karatantcheva is perhaps best known for reaching the quarterfinals of the 2005 French Open, upsetting seven-time Grand Slam champion Venus Williams en route. The same year, she twice tested positive for nandrolone and was therefore issued a two-year suspension. She returned to professional competition in January 2008.

Tennis career
She began playing tennis at the age of five. In 2001, 12-year-old Karatantcheva won the Orange Bowl tournament for her age group, defeating Alisa Kleybanova in the final. Early in her playing days, she trained for approximately six months at the famous IMG Academy of Nick Bollettieri.

2003-2004: Early career
Karatantcheva played her first professional tournament in September 2003 in Sofia, Bulgaria at the age of 14. As an unranked qualifier the next week, she defeated the No. 1, 2, and 3 seeds en route to her first professional tournament title at a small ITF tournament in Volos, Greece. Karatantcheva went on to win two other ITF titles in 2003.
In 2004, Karatantcheva began her season at the WTA tournament in Indian Wells, where she defeated Alexandra Stevenson in the first, and upset the 17th seed Magüi Serna in the second round. In an interview prior to her match against 16th seed Maria Sharapova, Karatantcheva claimed that Sharapova had skipped a hitting session with her a few weeks earlier in Florida, and began a war of words with the Russian. 

Sharapova then defeated Karatantcheva in three sets in the third round. On April 19, she played her first match for the Bulgaria Fed Cup team. Because of her age, Karatantcheva was restricted in the number of tournaments she was able to play. In August, she reached the quarterfinals of a WTA tournament in Vancouver, British Columbia, and qualified for the US Open, before losing to eventual champion Svetlana Kuznetsova in the first round. Karatantcheva also reached the quarterfinals of the WTA tournament in Québec City, and captured another ITF tournament in December at Palm Beach Gardens. In 2004 she became the French Open junior champion.

2005: Breakthrough and first French Open quarterfinal
2005 was Karatantcheva's breakthrough year. She started off the year at the tournament in Gold Coast, Australia by qualifying, and then defeating the tournament's No. 7 seed Elena Likhovtseva before falling in the quarterfinals. She then qualified for the Australian Open, losing to the No. 4 seed Sharapova in the first round. Her most successful tournament to date was at Roland Garros where Karatantcheva defeated the No. 19 seed Shinobu Asagoe in the second round, and then stunned the world with her victory over the No. 11 seed and former world number one Venus Williams in the third round.  After defeating Emmanuelle Gagliardi, she fell to Likhovtseva in the quarterfinals. Karatantcheva became the youngest female to reach the quarterfinals of a Grand Slam tournament since Martina Hingis in 1996. At Wimbledon, she lost to Sharapova once again, being able to win just one game.

In 2005, Karatantcheva also won a European club championship in Rennes as a member of the Cherno More Elite team (Bulgarian: Черно море Елит). Her teammates were Virginiya Trifonova, Maria Penkova and Tsvetana Pironkova.

At the end of the year, Karatantcheva came up eighth in the Bulgarian Sportsperson of the Year rankings, earning 676 points. She was also honoured by the Bulgarian Tennis Federation as the "Best female tennis player of the year".

On December 20, 2005, the French sports newspaper L'Equipe reported that Karatantcheva had failed a drug test earlier in the year at Roland Garros (after the 1/4 final match against Likhovtseva), and that she had appeared in front of a three-person panel of judges to explain the results. The newspaper claims that Karatantcheva said she was pregnant at the time of the test, which would explain the high levels of nandrolone in her system. Karatantcheva has denied all allegations, saying "I am shocked. I have not appeared before judges of the international federation."

2006-2007: Doping scandal and two-year suspension
On 11 January 2006, the ITF issued a two-year ban after two positive drug tests for nandrolone. While Karatantcheva has claimed she was pregnant at the time of one of the tests, another laboratory carried out a pregnancy test on her urine sample, and it tested negative. On 3 July 2006, the Court of Arbitration for Sport denied her appeal to overturn the ban with the argument that said nandrolone was found in concentrations which were inconsistent with the normal levels for that stage of pregnancy.

Karatantcheva did not play any matches in 2006 or 2007 following her drug ban. She mainly trained in Pravets.

2008

Karatantcheva's first match after the ban was in a pre-qualification tournament for a wildcard into the $25k tournament in Surprise, Arizona. She won three matches in one day to win the event and thus won a wildcard for the qualifying draw, in which she beat Susanna Lingman, Maria Kondratieva, and Kristína Kučová. In the main draw, Karatantcheva beat the fifth seed Sunitha Rao in three sets in the first round, and Robin Stephenson in the second round. In the quarterfinals, Karatantcheva beat Magdaléna Rybáriková in two sets, and in the semifinals she defeated the second seed Viktoriya Kutuzova. In the finals, Sesil played a tough three-set match and overcame the eighth seed American Angela Haynes.

In late January, still unranked, she entered another $25k tournament at La Quinta, and again battled through three rounds of qualifying into the main draw, despite a scare in her qualifying match against American player Stacia Fonseca, who took the first set. Having fended off a spirited challenge from second-seeded Angelika Bachmann in the first round of the main draw, she made light work of subsequent opponents en route to the semifinals, where for the second tournament in succession she was scheduled to play Viktoriya Kutuzova. This time, the match ran to three sets, but Karatantcheva ultimately prevailed in three sets. In the final, Karatantcheva defeated the third seed Sandra Klösel.

Karatantcheva attracted criticism from the Bulgarian tennis federation for competing at La Quinta in preference to participating in Bulgaria's Federation Cup tie scheduled the same week. She was accused of breach of contract and threatened with a fine, but the Bulgarian teenager stood by her decision, which she had taken on the grounds that it was proving extremely difficult for her to gain entry even to low-level tournaments following the loss of all her ranking points and any right to protected ranking status after her ban, so she needed to work at re-establishing herself at least in the mid-hundreds of the WTA rankings as a matter of priority before tending to national team commitments.

In February, the Bulgarian was awarded a wildcard into the $75k Midland event, but her winning streak came to an abrupt end as she was defeated in the first round by qualifier Valérie Tétreault of Canada, who had raced through the three qualifying rounds for the loss of just nine games, five of them against former top 50 star Mirjana Lučić. Karatantcheva then attempted to qualify for the WTA Tier III event in Memphis but lost in the first round of qualifying to Hana Šromová of the Czech Republic.

In early March, she qualified for the $50k Las Vegas event including victories over Amber Liu and Elena Bovina. However, she lost in the first round of the main draw to wildcarded American Madison Brengle. She also received a wildcard into the qualifying event for the Tier I event at Indian Wells but lost in the first round of qualifying to Evgeniya Rodina. Her luck changed however, when, at the end of March, she managed to qualify and reach the final of the $50k event in Latina, losing to Iveta Benešová in straight sets.

In April, she reached the quarterfinals of the $25k event at Civitavecchia, losing to Betina Jozami of Argentina in straight sets. Her route through to the final of the $25k event in Palm Beach Gardens, Florida, included a victory over seventh-seeded Lauren Albanese. Argentinian Soledad Esperón beat her in two sets in the final.

In May, she played her first WTA main-draw match since her suspension in Fes, Morocco against Elena Baltacha which she won in straight sets.
In June, Sesil reached the quarterfinals of the $75k tournament in Marseille. In the qualifications of Wimbledon, she lost in the second round to Magdaléna Rybáriková from Slovakia.

2009: Representing Kazakhstan
On 10 January 2009, it was announced that Karatantcheva would take Kazakh citizenship and compete for the Kazakhstan Fed Cup team. She did not participate in Fed Cup competitions for Kazakhstan during 2009.

In tournament play in January, she reached the second round (as a qualifier) at the Brisbane International, defeating top 50 player Iveta Benešová along the way and then backed it up by playing (and winning) her first main-draw major match (again as a qualifier) at the Australian Open. She then lost in the second round to Peng Shuai. This was to be her last main tournament playing for Bulgaria until 2015.

2010: First WTA semifinal
At the Pattaya Open, Karatantcheva reached her first WTA semifinal, before losing to Tamarine Tanasugarn. Karatantcheva qualified for the Aegon Classic tournament in Birmingham where she reached the quarterfinals winning five matches in a row, upsetting Yaroslava Shvedova in straight sets in the second round, before losing to second seed Maria Sharapova.

2011
Karatantcheva failed to qualify in Brisbane, Melbourne, Pattaya, and Monterrey. She reached the final of a $25k event in Clearwater, Florida, losing to Ajla Tomljanović. At the French Open, she lost to Olga Govortsova in the final round of qualifying. After barely missing out on qualifying for the Aegon Classic, Karatantcheva fell to Arina Rodionova in the first round of qualifying of Wimbledon. She took a two-week break following Wimbledon.

She returned at the WTA Palermo, where she qualified for the main draw. She drew second seed Roberta Vinci in the first round. Although Karatantcheva played well she was beaten in straight sets. She then competed in two $100k events – in Bucharest and Astana, losing in the early round of both tournaments.

She then failed to qualify for the US Open, marking the first year since 2009 that she had not competed in the main draw of a major. Her poor form continued, losing in the first or second rounds of four more ITF tournaments.

She began to improve her game by advancing to the semifinals of a $50k event in Troy, Alabama. She then competed in a $25k tournament in Rock Hill, losing in the quarterfinals. Karatantcheva then played  at the $50k event in Grapevine, Texas, where she advanced to the final, losing to 8th seed Kurumi Nara in three sets. Following her performance in Grapevine, Sesil achieved her best result of the year by winning a $75k tournament, the Goldwater Women's Tennis Classic, in Phoenix, Arizona, the biggest title of her career. She won the title dropping only two sets the entire tournament, defeating a seeded player along the way. Karatantcheva's recent change in form has propelled her well back inside the top 200 and she established herself as one of the leading Kazakh players.

2012
Karatantcheva began the year ranked World No. 139. She failed to qualify in Brisbane and at the Australian Open. She then competed in the $100k tournament in Cali. Unseeded, she advanced to the semifinals before losing to Mandy Minella. She then played at the Copa Sony Ericsson Colsanitas and Monterrey Open. Although she qualified for both, she lost in the first round to Catalina Castaño and Yaroslava Shvedova, respectively. Sesil then qualified for the Abierto Mexicano Telcel. Although she put up a fight, Sesil was defeated by sixth seed Johanna Larsson in three sets, in the first round. Karatantcheva committed 18 double faults during the match – almost an all-time high in WTA history. Karatantcheva then competed at the Indian Wells Open and the Miami Open, losing in the first round of qualifying for both tournaments. Despite the losses, she rebounded and reached the final of a $50k event, losing to Arantxa Rus.

Karatantcheva headed to Portugal for the Estoril Open. In the first round of qualifications, she drew Italian Maria Elena Camerin, whom she defeated in three tough sets. In the second round of qualifying, however, she was defeated by Mariana Duque-Marino, despite the fact she was leading with a break in the deciding set. Karatantcheva then lost in the first round of qualifying of the Madrid Open. At the French Open, she lost in the final round of qualifying to Alexa Glatch. However, she was offered a spot in the main draw after the withdrawal of Vera Zvonareva. She played Tímea Babos in the first round and won in two easy sets. This was Karatantcheva's first Grand Slam tournament main-draw appearance in almost 2 1/2 years.

She opened her grass-court season at the Aegon Classic in Birmingham. She entered the qualifying draw and defeated local girl Francesca Stephenson, but fell to Thailand's Noppawan Lertcheewakarn in the final round. However, she was offered a place in the main draw as a lucky loser due to the withdrawal of another player. She faced another Thai player, Tamarine Tanasugarn, defeating her in straight sets. Her run was ended in the second round by eighth seed Ekaterina Makarova. She then lost in the final round of qualifying at Wimbledon. Despite the loss, her ranking climbed due to her improved result from 2011.

Karatantcheva then played at the Bank of the West Classic. She fell in the first round of qualifying. She then qualified for the Premier-level Mercury Insurance Open in Carlsbad. She was points away from winning, but was finally beaten by Melinda Czink in the first round. She then competed at the second annual Washington Open where she lost to Sloane Stephens in the first round. She then continued her hardcourt season at the Rogers Cup in Montreal. As the 18th seed in qualifying, she won three matches for a place in the main draw. In the first round she dismantled Sorana Cîrstea, without losing a single game, in only 43 minutes. Karatantcheva lost to 16th seed Lucie Šafářová in the second round in straight sets. Her ranking climbed to No. 92, her highest ranking since 2005. Karatantcheva then played at the Western & Southern Open, qualifying into the main draw by beating world No. 64 Arantxa Rus and Olga Govortsova. In the first round of the main draw, she won against fellow qualifier Kiki Bertens, but was soundly beaten by former world No. 1, Caroline Wozniacki, in the second round. Her next tournament was the US Open. Ranked world No. 85, she was given direct entrance into the main draw. She lost to Lourdes Domínguez Lino in the first round.

Following the US Open, Karatantcheva competed in Québec and Seoul, losing in the first round of both tournaments. She continued by then losing in the qualifying draw of the next four events in Tokyo, Beijing, Linz, and Moscow. Her final tournament of the year was in Phoenix, where she was the defending champion and second seed. She suffered a shock straight set loss to world No. 217 Shelby Rogers in the first round. Despite the loss, she ended the year at No. 93, her first year-end ranking inside the top 100 since 2005.

2013
Karatantcheva began the season at the Australian Open, losing to 6th seed Li Na in the first round. She next played for Kazakhstan in Fed Cup. Placed in the Asia/Oceania Zone Group I in Astana, Karatantcheva played with Galina Voskoboeva to beat Rutuja Bhosale and Ankita Raina, securing Kazakhstan's 3–0 sweep over India. Following Kazakhstan's win over Thailand, they defeated Uzbekistan in the Group I promotional play-off. Their win over Uzbekistan has catapulted Kazakhstan into the World Group II play-offs in April for the first time ever. Karatantcheva then played at the WTA 125,000 event in Cali, losing in the quarterfinals to Catalina Castaño in three sets. She then lost in Memphis qualifying before losing to Francesca Schiavone in the second round at Acapulco. Karatantcheva then qualified for the Indian Wells Open, but lost to Lara Arruabarrena in the first round. At the Miami Open, she entered the qualifying draw and defeated Anastasia Rodionova in the first round, saving two match points and battling almost three hours before winning. She lost in the final round to Silvia Soler Espinosa. Karatantcheva closed the hard court season with a first round loss in Osprey to Olga Puchkova.

Karatantcheva opened her clay court season by falling in the qualifying rounds in Charleston and Oeiras. She then won only two matches in her next four tournaments before heading to Wimbledon, where she lost in the final round of qualifying to Austrian Yvonne Meusburger in a close three-set match. Following Wimbledon, Karatantcheva played two more clay-court events in Budapest and Båstad, losing to Simona Halep and Serena Williams, respectively.

After skipping the first week of the US Open Series, Karatantcheva entered the Southern California Open in Carlsbad. She played the qualifying draw and won three consecutive matches against Chieh-yu Hsu, Katalin Marosi, and Ivana Lisjak for a spot in the main draw. There, she drew Julia Görges and defeated the world No. 42 in straight sets. She advanced to the second round but lost to eventual champion Samantha Stosur, winning only five games. Despite the loss, her win over Görges was the biggest win of her season. Her next tournament was the Rogers Cup in Toronto where she fell in the first round of qualifying. Her ranking plummeted to No. 163 as a result of her failure to defend 2012's second round points. At the US Open, Karatantcheva played the qualifying draw and won two matches before losing out to Mirjana Lučić-Baroni in straight sets.

Following the US Open, Karatantcheva played at the Challenge Bell, again entering the qualifying draw. She beat Élisabeth Fournier, Petra Rampre, and CoCo Vandeweghe to enter the main draw. She played fellow qualifier Amra Sadiković and beat the Swiss in straight sets. In the second round, she lost to fifth seeded local hope Eugenie Bouchard. She returned to the United States to compete in two ITF Circuit events in Albuquerque and Las Vegas, losing in the first round of both tournaments. Her final events of the season saw her lose in Linz qualifying, bow out to Karin Knapp in the first round of the Luxembourg Open, and lose in the first round of an ITF event in Nantes.

2014
Karatantcheva made her 2014 debut at the Hobart International, losing in the first round of qualifying to Belgian Alison Van Uytvanck. At the Australian Open, she was seeded 22nd in the qualifying draw and lost there in the first round to Duan Yingying in straight sets. For Kazakhstan in 2014 Fed Cup in the Group I final position play-off, Karatantcheva played Liu Fangzhou and defeated the Chinese in three sets, ultimately sending Kazakhstan into third place in the Asia/Oceania Group I Zone. After that, Karatantcheva competed in Midland, losing out to young American Victoria Duval, and then traveled to Brazil to compete at the Rio Open and Brasil Tennis Cup. In Rio, she fell in the qualifying competition to Verónica Cepede Royg. In Florianopolis, however, she was more successful with qualifying wins over world No. 95 Anabel Medina Garrigues and Alexandra Panova, the latter match lasting over three hours. Her run was ended in the first round by Kiki Bertens.

Karatantcheva proceeded to compete in Osprey, but lost to Gioia Barbieri in the first round. At the Family Circle Cup, she played qualifying and overcame Sanaz Marand before bowing out to Alla Kudryavtseva. She next played at the Dothan Pro Tennis Classic, but suffered another loss, going down to world No. 125 Michelle Larcher de Brito in the first round. Karatantcheva's final clay-court event in the United States was in Charlottesville, in which she was able to pick up form by reaching the quarterfinals. For the second consecutive year, she entered the Nürnberger Versicherungscup, but was defeated in the qualifying draw by German Nina Zander. At the French Open, she won one match in the qualifying draw but would progress no further, as she was eliminated by Laura Siegemund in what was a tough three-set match. She would then compete in Marseille, advancing to the quarterfinals before going down to Johanna Larsson in a final-set tiebreak. Karatantcheva elected to skip all grass court events before Wimbledon, and suffered another Grand Slam defeat, this time at the hands of young Estonian Anett Kontaveit in the second round of qualifying.

She entered the inaugural Bucharest Open, winning three qualifying matches before losing to Silvia Soler Espinosa in the first round. Karatantcheva then played qualifying at the İstanbul Cup but was beaten in the first round by Ana Konjuh of Croatia. She returned to the ITF Circuit at the $50k Powiat Poznański Open in Sobota, advancing to the final having only dropped a set, but suffered a disappointing three-set loss there after winning the first set. It was her first final since April 2012. At US Open qualifying she was beaten in the first round by Melanie Oudin.

Karatantcheva returned to action at the Canadian Open as a direct entrant in the main draw. She began with a win over Sanaz Marand in the first round and squared off against third seeded Kristina Mladenovic in the second, edging the Frenchwoman in a match that lasted over two-and-a-half hours. Karatantcheva subsequently moved on to the quarterfinals but was defeated there by Mirjana Lučić-Baroni, who would go on to win the tournament.

In October, Karatantcheva announced that she had decided to play for her home country Bulgaria again. She and her father first made the decision known to the Bulgarian public in an interview for TV7. Her switch back to Bulgaria was finalized a few weeks later and she reappeared under the Bulgarian flag in the 20 October WTA rankings.

2015: Representing Bulgaria once again
Karatancheva's first tournament of the year was the Auckland Open, where she lost in the third round of the qualifying competition to Urszula Radwańska. Karatancheva also failed to qualify for the Australian Open, losing in the second qualifying round to Alexandra Panova. In February, she participated at the Abierto Mexicano where she was defeated in straight sets in the third qualifying round by Lucie Hradecká, but nonetheless reached the main tournament as a lucky loser. Karatantcheva then eliminated Marie Bouzková, Kiki Bertens and Monica Puig to secure herself a place in the semifinals for the second time in her career. She subsequently lost to fifth seed Timea Bacsinszky in two sets. Next, she played at Monterrey Open, where she lost in the first round of qualifying. Despite the setback, Karatantcheva was nonetheless able to stay on course towards improving her ranking by qualifying for the main phase of the Indian Wells Open shortly after that. In the first round, she managed a two-set victory over compatriot and friend Tsvetana Pironkova. This was the first time since 2000 that two Bulgarian women had met in the main draw of a WTA tournament. Karatantcheva then suffered a defeat in straight sets to CoCo Vandeweghe. Next, Karatantcheva qualified for the main draw of Miami Open, where she reached the second round, defeating Lauren Davis then ranked No. 61, in the first round in straight sets, and losing to 21st seed Garbiñe Muguruza. Her ranking improved to 109. Next, at the Family Circle Cup in Charleston, she qualified for the main draw, beating Arantxa Rus and Louisa Chirico along the way, and lost in the first round to ninth seed Samantha Stosur. At the French Open, Karatantcheva was seeded 3rd in the qualifying draw and she qualified for the main draw. In the first round she defeated former world No. 1, Jelena Janković, in straight sets, which allowed her to return to the top 100 in the WTA rankings. Then, she lost in the second round to Irina Falconi in three sets. Due to her improved ranking, Karatantcheva entered the main draw at Wimbledon. In the first round, she lost to Silvia Soler Espinosa in a tight three-setter match. At the US Open, Karatantcheva suffered a 1–6, 2–6 loss to Belinda Bencic from Switzerland.

2016
The new season began with a disappointment at Brisbane, where she lost in the first round of the qualifying draw. She played at Sydney, starting once again from the qualifications, defeating Yaroslava Shvedova (after taking a 4–1 lead in the first set and her opponent retiring) in the first round, but then succumbing in straight sets to Magdaléna Rybáriková. At the qualifying competition for the Australian Open Karatantcheva was seeded fourth. However, she was unable to pass the first hurdle, being defeated 6–2, 6–0 by American Jessica Pegula. Karatantcheva did not manage to reach the main draw of the 2016 French Open, losing to Maryna Zanevska in three sets after taking the first one in the second round of qualifying, for which she was not among the seeds. Her downturn in fortunes continued in Wimbledon, where she suffered elimination in the first round of the qualifying competition at the hands of Shérazad Reix in a hard-fought match that was decided in three sets. At the qualifying competition for the US Open, Karatantcheva posted a win in three sets against Rebecca Šramková in the first round, but was then defeated by Elise Mertens in another three-setter match.

2017
Karatantcheva did not get past the first hurdle at the qualifying tournament for the Australian Open, being on the receiving end of a 6–3, 6–2 defeat by Anna Blinkova. After not participating in the qualifying competitions for the French Open and Wimbledon, in late August 2017 she entered the one for the US Open, where she convincingly defeated Arantxa Rus in the first round, but then lost in a dramatic three-setter match (that was decided by a tiebreak) against American Claire Liu. In September 2017, Karatantcheva won the title at the Red Rock Pro Open in Las Vegas, defeating compatriot Elitsa Kostova in the final by a score of 6–4, 4–6, 7–5.

2018
Karatantcheva played in the qualifying of the Australian Open, but had to exit in the first round losing 5–7, 6–3, 5–7 to Irina Bara. She was also eliminated in the earliest possible stage of the qualifying draw for the French Open, being on the receiving end of a 1–6, 6–2, 2–6 loss against Ons Jabeur. The negative trend continued in her first qualifying match for Wimbledon, in which she emerged second best to Mayo Hibi by a score of 6–1, 3–6, 1–6. The qualifying event for the US Open saw a repeat of her previous performances, as Karatantcheva did not get past the first round, being defeated 6–3, 2–6, 6–4 by Italian Martina Trevisan.

2019
Karatantcheva entered the Australian Open qualifying, taking the first set against American Asia Muhammad, but eventually lost the other two. Her luck didn't change in the qualifying draw for Wimbledon when she was defeated in straight sets by Romanian Elena-Gabriela Ruse. This has been her last tournament to date.

2021
In 2021, Karatantcheva established her own tennis academy in Sofia.

Personal life
She is the daughter of former rower and member of parliament as part of the Bulgarian Business Bloc, Radoslav Karatantchev. He also used to be a member of the Bulgarian Socialist Party and additionally acts as Karatatcheva′s coach.

She has three sisters, one of whom, Gabriel Karatantcheva, was active as a professional tennis player from 2014 to 2017. Karatantcheva married long-time boyfriend and former footballer Georgi Dolmov in November 2017. On 20 August 2021, she gave birth to her first child.

Grand Slam performance timeline

WTA career finals

Doubles: 1 (1 runner–up)

ITF Circuit finals

Singles: 17 (9 titles, 8 runner–ups)

Fed Cup participation
Sesil Karatantcheva debuted for the Bulgaria Fed Cup team in 2004, winning her singles match in the tie against the Estonia Fed Cup team. Between 2010 and 2014 she competed for the Kazakhstan Fed Cup team. She maintains a 12–5 singles record and a 7–8 doubles record (19–13 overall). In January 2017, Karatantcheva was recalled to the Bulgarian team for the February 2017 Europe/Africa Zone (Group I) matches.

Singles (12–5)

Doubles (7–8)

See also

 List of sportspeople sanctioned for doping offences

Notes

References

External links
 
 
 
 US Today interview

1989 births
Living people
Naturalised citizens of Kazakhstan
Naturalised tennis players
Bulgarian expatriate sportspeople in the United States
Bulgarian female tennis players
Bulgarian expatriate sportspeople in Kazakhstan
Kazakhstani female tennis players
Hopman Cup competitors
Bulgarian sportspeople in doping cases
Doping cases in tennis
Sportspeople from Sofia
Grand Slam (tennis) champions in girls' singles
French Open junior champions